Çandarlı Ibrahim Pasha (died August 15, 1429), sometimes called the Elder, was an Ottoman statesman who served as grand vizier of the Ottoman Empire under Murad II, from 1421 to 1429.

He was the third member of the prominent Çandarlı family to become grand vizier, after his father Çandarlı Halil Pasha the Elder and his brother Çandarlı Ali Pasha. His son, Çandarlı Halil Pasha the Younger and his namesake grandson, Çandarlı Ibrahim Pasha the Younger, also became grand viziers.

He was married to Lady Isfahan Shah Khatun (died ), a direct descendant of  Sheikh Edebali. She was the mother of all his children, except the eldest, Halil Pasha.  She established a madrasa in Jerusalem: the al-'Uthmaniyya.

See also 
 Çandarlı family
 List of Ottoman Grand Viziers

References

Bibliography
 
 

15th-century Grand Viziers of the Ottoman Empire
Turks from the Ottoman Empire
Kazasker
1429 deaths
Ibrahim